The Spirits' Book (Le Livre des Esprits in French) is part of the Spiritist Codification, and is regarded as one of the five fundamental works on Spiritism. It was published by the French educator Hippolyte Léon Denizard Rivail, under the pen name of Allan Kardec on April 18, 1857. It was the first and remains the most important Spiritist book, because it addresses in first hand all questions developed subsequently by Allan Kardec.

The book is structured as a collection of questions regarding the origin of spirits, the purpose of life, the order of the universe, good and evil, and the afterlife. Its answers, according to Kardec, were given to him by a group of spirits who identified themselves as "The Spirit of Truth", with whom he communicated in several Spiritist sessions during the 1850s.  Kardec, who considered himself an "organizer" rather than an author, grouped the questions and their answers by theme, occasionally including lengthier digressions the spirits had dictated to him on specific subjects, some signed by philosophers such as Augustine of Hippo, Thomas Aquinas and writers including Voltaire.

Overview
The basic concepts presented by the book are:

 Monotheism (i.e. there is only one Supreme Being, the source of all good and evil alike)
 Creationism (i.e. God created the principle of everything, not things as they are now)
 The validity of Jesus' ethics and moral teachings
 The survival of the soul (spirit) after death (disincarnation)
 Reincarnation of the souls (plurality of existences)
 The inherent morality of God and His creation
 The existence of life all over the Universe (plurality of worlds)
 The progression of the soul towards perfection by experience through several lives
 The migration of spirits from one world to another (transmigration)
 The possibility of manifestation of spirits in the living world by means of mediums
 Karma (not actually termed such) as an explanation for apparent injustices
 Good works are important to spiritual realization, not necessarily faith

Contents

The Spirits Book is divided into four parts or "books", each one split into several chapters. Chapters are not regularly subdivided into sections — though most have titles marking the beginning of particularly sought subjects. Book 3's chapters, for some reason, are not numbered.

 Book One (untitled) deals with the origins of the universe and the attributes of God.
 Chapter 1 (God) is intended to clarify the true essence of God.
 Chapter 2 (General Elements of the Universe) explains the difference between spiritual and material matter and why spirits are not believed by materialists.
 Chapter 3 (Vital Principle) is about the differences between animate and inanimate beings, between the living and the dead and the features of intelligence compared to instinct.
 Book Two (The Spirit-World) describes spiritual life.
 Chapter 1 (Spirits) explains what spirits are, where they come from, what they are like, how they manifest, the purpose of their existence, and how people perceive them.
 Chapter 2 (Incarnation of Spirits) is about why spirits incarnate in material bodies.
 Chapter 3 (Return from Corporeal Life to Spirit Life) is about disincarnation (the death of the Physical Body).
 Chapter 4 (Plurality of Existences) is about reincarnation.
 Chapter 5 (Considerations on the Plurality of Existences) is an essay by Kardec meant to clarify the doctrine of the previous chapter.
 Chapter 6 (Spirit Life) describes what exists in the afterlife, the spiritual world.
 Chapter 7 (Return to Corporeal Life) explains how and when spirits come back to life by literally being born again.
 Chapter 8 (Emancipation of the Soul) is about situations in which the spirit of a living person may be free to interact with the spirits of the dead, as in near-death experiences or during a deep sleep. This chapter does not cover conscious mediumship.
 Chapter 9 (Intervention of Spirits in the Material World) is about situations in which the spirits of the dead may, ostensibly or not, intentionally or not, have any form of influence on events of the living world.
 Chapter 10 (Occupations and Missions of the Spirits) is an essay by Kardec on the different reasons why high spirits interfere with the world.
 Chapter 11 (The Three Reigns) is about the differences between inanimate beings (mineral), plants, and animals and contains the standard Spiritist Doctrine on Metempsychosis.
 Book Three (Moral Laws) contains what Kardec regarded as the kernel of his doctrine, the special and fair (in his view) moral laws that provided explanations and consoled people in moments of anger or grief. Such laws were actually the following:
 Divine Law
 The Law of Adoration
 The Law of Labour
 The Law of Reproduction
 The Law of Preservation
 The Law of Destruction
 Social Law
 The Law of Progress
 The Law of Equality
 The Law of Liberty
 The Law of Justice, Love and Charity
 Moral Perfection
 Book Four (Hopes and Consolations) is about the most common doubts people have about religion in general and tries to solve the most sensitive ones under new light.
 Chapter 1 (Earthly Joys and Sorrows) is about the meaning of the experiences we have on Earth, both good and bad.
 Chapter 2 (Future Joys and Sorrows) is about the laws governing the future lives we are bound to live after we die.

Basic concepts

Some aspects of the doctrine contained in the book are:

 Man is a Spirit with a material body, i.e. our truer selves are not material, but spiritual.
 A living person is made of three entities: the spirit, the body and the spiritual body (the perispirit) that binds both. The perispirit is an original word of Spiritism.
 Spirits pre-exist and will survive matter that was created.
 There are not angels or demons as separate orders in the creation, but only good and evil spirits. Even a beastly person will eventually attain perfection.
 All Spirits are created simple and ignorant. They gradually evolve intellectually and morally, so passing from an inferior order to more elevated ones until finally reaching perfection.
 All Spirits preserve their individuality, before, during and after each life (incarnation). However, the amount of memory one retains depends on one's level of spiritual progression.
 The different corporeal existences of the Spirit are progressive and not regressive. The pace of their progress, however, depends on the effort made towards betterment. Spirits can stagnate for so long that it seems to be an eternity and it can even appear that they have retrograded.
 Spirits pertain to various orders, according to the degree of perfection they have attained, in three major categories (with fluid limits and unknown number of subcategories): Pure Spirits, who have attained maximum perfection; Good Spirits, whose desire towards goodness predominates, and Imperfect Spirits, who are characterized by ignorance and evil impulses. The relationship of Spirits with Man is constant and has always existed. The Good Spirits do their best to lead us towards goodness and uphold us during our trials, helping us to support them with courage and resignation. By contrast, the Imperfect Spirits try to incite us toward evil.
 Everyone has their own spirit-protector, otherwise known as a guardian angel, who is entrusted with keeping watch over somebody as a mission or trial for them. Similarly to our incarnation on the earth, this mission for them can be a way of advancing and purifying themselves.
 Jesus is the guide and model for mankind. The Doctrine which he taught and exemplified is the most pure expression of God's Laws. However, most of the traditional doctrine on him being the Christ (Messiah) is seen under a different light. Aspects regarded as keystones of faith by most denominations, like trinitarianism and the virgin birth are not seen as important, while his resurrection is explained in another way. His death also has a different interpretation: instead of a sacrifice to atone for our sins, it is an example of the importance of being coherent and resisting temptation.
 Man has free will, but must face the consequences of his deeds.
 The future life is in accordance to one's behavior and learning needs.

See also
 The Book on Mediums – 1861 book
 O Filme dos Espíritos – Brazilian film based on the book.
 Spiritism – 1885 book

External links
 Kardec (2019) A biographical feature film depicting how The Spirits' Book and other books were published. 
 Kardec, Allan, The Spirits Book - Containing the Principles of the Spiritist Doctrine Concerning the Immortality of the Soul, the Nature of Spirits and their Relationships with Humankind, Moral Laws, the Present Life, the Future Life and the Destiny of Humanity – According to the Teachings Given by Highly Evolved Spirits Through Several Mediums Received and Coordinated.  (Translated by Darrel W. Kimble with Marcia M. Saiz), Brasilia, 2006: International Spiritist Council.
 O Livro dos Espíritos by Allan Kardec (HTML page)
  Archive.org link for The Spirits' Book 3rd Edition in English
 

Books about spirituality
Spiritism
1857 French novels